The Men's 5 km competition of the open water swimming events at the 2015 World Aquatics Championships was held on 25 July 2015.

Results
The race was started at 13:00.

References

Men's 5 km
World Aquatics Championships